A crossover is the placement of two or more otherwise discrete fictional characters, settings, or universes into the context of a single story. They can arise from legal agreements between the relevant copyright holders, unofficial efforts by fans, or common corporate ownership.

Background

Official 
Crossovers often occur in an official capacity in order for the intellectual property rights holders to reap the financial reward of combining two or more popular, established properties. In other cases, the crossover can serve to introduce a new concept derivative of an older one.

Crossovers generally occur between properties owned by a single holder, but they can, more rarely, involve properties from different holders, provided that the inherent legal obstacles can be overcome. They may also involve using characters that have passed into the public domain with those concurrently under copyright protection.

A crossover story may try to explain its own reason for the crossover, such as characters being neighbors (notable examples being the casts from The Golden Girls and Empty Nest) or meeting via dimensional rift or similar phenomenon (a common explanation for science fiction properties that have different owners). Some crossovers are not explained at all. Others are absurd or simply impossible within the fictional setting, and have to be ignored by the series' respective continuities. Still, others intentionally make the relations between two or more fictional universes confusing, as with The Simpsons and Futurama, where each show is fiction in the other.

Unofficial 
In contrast with legal crossovers, unofficial crossovers are created solely because of the artistic pleasure derived by their creators. Unofficial crossovers often take the form of fan-written fiction and fan art, but the trope is increasingly prevalent in amateur films and audio. Whereas official crossovers are frequently stymied by such concerns as copyright, royalties payments, quality of writing and ownership of the characters, unofficial crossovers are unfettered by such concerns, so long as property holders do not exercise their right to enjoin the distribution of such material. A good example would be the unauthorised live action fan film Batman: Dead End which brings together the properties of Batman, Alien and Predator in one setting.

Unofficial crossovers can also occur in a "what-if" scenario. Roger makes frequent cameo appearances in Family Guy, while Brian makes cameos on American Dad!. Roger, Rallo Tubbs, and Klaus Heissler were seen in the final Family Guy Star Wars spoof, "It's A Trap!", as Moff Jerjerrod, Nien Nunb, and Admiral Ackbar, respectively. Stewie also appears as an interactive hallucination of Booth on Bones when the agent has issues over possibly becoming a sperm donor, with David Boreanaz (who plays Booth) repaying the favor in "Road to the North Pole". An appearance by Elmo, from Sesame Street, was made, in a hallucination of Connie Ray's, on TV sitcom The Torkelsons. Fan fiction fusions between different science fiction movies and series are often created, such as Star Wars and Star Trek or Babylon 5 and Stargate. M.U.G.E.N. is a fighting game engine that features many fan-created and fictional characters and stages from various television series, movies, as well as other video games.

Comics 

Crossovers of multiple characters, owned by one company or published by one publisher, have been used to set an established continuity, where characters can frequently meet within one setting. This is especially true of comic book publishers, as different characters in various Marvel, DC, or Valiant comic books frequently interact with one another since they live in a "shared universe". For example, in the Marvel Comics universe, Spider-Man has frequent dealings with another Marvel hero, Daredevil, just as in the DC Comics Universe, the Flash and Green Lantern often collaborate. In comic book terminology, these "guest star" roles are common enough that they are generally not considered crossovers; rather, this short-term collaboration to fight crime is called a team-up. A crossover in comic book terms only occurs when a story spans more than one title. This has led to "crossover events" in which major occurrences are shown as affecting most or all of the stories in the shared universe; see Category:Crossover comics.

The earliest such crossover event was Gardner Fox's Zatanna's Search which took place in Hawkman #4 (October/November 1964), Detective Comics #336 (February 1965), The Atom #19 (June/July 1965), Green Lantern #42 (January 1966), Detective Comics #355 (September 1966), and Justice League of America #51 (February 1967). This story dealt with Zatanna attempting to reconnect with her father, Zatara, and seeking the aid of Hawkman, Batman, Robin, the Atom, Green Lantern, and the Elongated Man along the way.

The first major crossover event was spearheaded by the Marvel Editor-in-Chief at the time, Jim Shooter. As a way to further toy sales he devised the Secret Wars crossover which brought all the major Marvel heroes into a 12-issue miniseries to battle a common threat. After the threat was dealt with, they all returned to their regular titles. Secret Wars was hailed as both a critical and commercial success, largely because the events of the crossover had lasting effects on the characters (such as the introduction of Spider-Man's black suit which would later become the villain Venom). Jim Shooter later perfected his crossover technique at Valiant Comics with the Unity event. Unity brought all the Valiant characters together to defeat Mothergod, but was told within the existing Valiant Comics titles (and two bookend special issues). Readers were not obliged to buy all 18 chapters as the story was coherent when reading just one title, but far more layered when all were read. Like Secret Wars, the Unity crossover had lasting effects on the Valiant universe; most notably the introduction of Turok, the birth of Magnus, Robot Fighter and the death of a major Valiant hero.

Dark Horse Comics's Aliens Versus Predator comic book franchise was a success that continued into many video games, two films and even an Aliens versus Predator versus The Terminator comic book miniseries.

The comic crossovers from Raj Comics are very famous in India, in which the superheroes meet to fight a common enemy. Many of these crossovers have occurred between Nagraj and Super Commando Dhruva. In Kohram, all the heroes in the Raj Universe meet to finish Haru, an extremely powerful enemy.

Webcomics creators sometimes produce crossovers; one of the first was a two-week sequence between Christopher Baldwin's Bruno and Peter Zale's Helen, Sweetheart of the Internet in 1998.

In 2013, Archie Comics released a 12-part crossover of Capcom character Mega Man and Sega character Sonic the Hedgehog called "Worlds Collide". Taking place in issues of the Sonic the Hedgehog, Sonic Universe, and Mega Man comic book series from Archie, the crossover involved Dr. Eggman and Dr. Wily forming an alliance to take over both their universes and destroy their respective nemeses. Sonic and Mega Man were briefly tricked into fighting each other, but later joined forces and teamed up with other heroes to battle the doctors' forces, which included virtually every Robot Master introduced in the Mega Man games. The popularity of this crossover and the books involved led to a second crossover in 2015 entitled "Worlds Unite", which not only reunited Sonic and Mega Man, but also featured comics-exclusive characters from both of their books, the Mega Man X and Sonic Boom spinoff franchises and various other SEGA and Capcom franchises. This crossover was enabled by the conclusion of the first crossover, which saw a reboot to the Sonic books as their universe was drastically rewritten. Aftereffects of this included the Genesis Portals, gateways connecting worlds that would be exploited by Mega Man X villain Sigma and his minions, forcing a reunion between Sonic and Mega Man and an alliance between heroes of the various franchises involved. "Worlds Unite" spans not only the three series featured in the first crossover, but also includes the Sonic Boom comic series, which entered publication between the two crossovers.

There are also intercompany crossovers, where characters owned by two different companies meet, such as those from DC and Marvel.

Animation 
Cartoon crossovers are not uncommon, and most of them – like comics or live-action TV shows – will often feature characters owned by the same company or network. One example is Cartoon Network's The Grim Adventures of the Kids Next Door. It features five crossovers – Ed, Edd n Eddy, Codename: Kids Next Door, The Grim Adventures of Billy and Mandy, a reference to The Powerpuff Girls, and a quote from Scooby-Doo, which are all licensed Cartoon Network series. The cast of Ben 10: Ultimate Alien and Generator Rex team up in Ben 10/Generator Rex: Heroes United. Similarly, characters from Uncle Grandpa and Steven Universe appeared in a crossover episode "Say Uncle". The same occurred with The Powerpuff Girls and Teen Titans Go! in an episode called "TTG v PPG". OK K.O.! Let's Be Heroes did a crossover episode called "Crossover Nexus" to celebrate 25 years of Cartoon Network where the lead character joined forces with Ben 10, Garnet from Steven Universe and Raven from Teen Titans Go!. Most of the last episodes of the Lilo & Stitch: The Series (a spinoff of the film Lilo & Stitch) had crossovers with various other Disney cartoons, including The Proud Family, Kim Possible, Recess, and American Dragon Jake Long. The Jimmy Timmy Power Hour trilogy is another example, in which Jimmy Neutron and Timmy Turner switch universes. The Disney TV series Hercules, based on the 1997 film of the same name, had an episode titled "Hercules and the Arabian Night" that had a crossover between the characters of the TV series and film and with the characters of the Disney film Aladdin in which Hades and Jafar each try to get rid of each other's enemies (Hades would try to defeat Aladdin, while Jafar would try to defeat Hercules). Another crossover is Rugrats Go Wild in which the Rugrats are stranded on an island where The Wild Thornberrys were at the time. In Dexter's Laboratory "Dial M for Monkey" "Huntor" who tries to hunt Monkey is himself hunted; "Huntor" later makes a cameo crossover in Samurai Jack's "Jack vs. Mad Jack." 
During the 1970s and 1980s, crossovers were particularly common among the Hanna-Barbera properties. Some of the earliest examples happened on The New Scooby-Doo Movies which featured appearances by characters from Harlem Globetrotters, Josie and the Pussycats, Jeannie, Speed Buggy, Batman and Robin, and The Addams Family. Later, the Hanna-Barbera Superstars 10 set of movies involved several crossovers, including such combinations as The Jetsons Meet the Flintstones. This was taken to an extreme in the 1977–79 series Laff-A-Lympics, which was essentially a gathering of the Hanna-Barbera characters for a regular series.

Crossovers are not necessarily composed of characters under common ownership. Two of the most notable cartoon crossovers consisted of characters from different companies. Disney's movie Who Framed Roger Rabbit had characters from various companies, most notably Disney and Warner Bros. Daffy Duck and Donald Duck made a simultaneous appearance in one scene in which the two of them exchanged blows during a piano duet. Later in the movie, Bugs Bunny and Mickey Mouse were shown parachuting together (to keep things from getting too iffy legally, Mickey and Bugs' lines were written so that each of them said exactly the same number of words in the movie). The film also includes cameos of characters from MGM. The end of the movie features all the cartoons from all of the animation companies joining in song, to be concluded by Porky Pig stuttering his famous "That's All, Folks!" line as Tinker Bell ends the scene with a magical fade-out.

On February 27, 1998, the Fox Kids shows Power Rangers in Space and Ninja Turtles: The Next Mutation had their crossover with the episode "Shell Shocked".

On October 4, 1997, the two Kids WB shows, Superman: The Animated Series and The New Batman Adventures, had their first crossover with the TV movie World's Finest, which was also released on DVD.

Another cartoon crossover would occur in 1990, Cartoon All-Stars to the Rescue. This cartoon featured popular characters from children's Saturday morning cartoons, banding together to promote an anti-drug message. ABC, CBS, Fox, and NBC aired this half-hour special one Saturday morning with characters from all their networks, including Huey, Dewey, and Louie (from Disney's DuckTales), Winnie the Pooh, Tigger, Slimer (from The Real Ghostbusters and Extreme Ghostbusters), Michelangelo (from Teenage Mutant Ninja Turtles), Bugs Bunny, Daffy Duck, Alvin and the Chipmunks, the Smurfs, ALF (from his short-lived cartoon spinoff), Garfield, and the trio of Baby Kermit, Baby Piggy, and Baby Gonzo (from Jim Henson's Muppet Babies). Animation companies granted unlimited, royalty-free use of their cartoon characters for this project, a feat that has been unequalled before or since. This cartoon was also introduced by then-President George H. W. Bush and Barbara Bush, and would be distributed to schools and video stores free of charge nationwide.

Manga artist Leiji Matsumoto has been known to cross over the characters of his various stories and characters such as Captain Harlock, Galaxy Express 999, and Queen Millennia, all of which were originally written as separate, self-contained stories. In the Maetel Legend, Queen Promethium is revealed to be having been Yukino Yaoi, the protagonist from Queen Millennia. Matsumoto has also created various crossovers with Space Battleship Yamato, an anime on which he served as director, although the rights to Yamato are actually owned by Yoshinobu Nishizaki.

The adult parody-oriented series Drawn Together features many crossovers; while some are regular cameos, such as Peter and Lois Griffin from Family Guy, others involve a personality twist, such as the homicidal version of Bambi from the eponymous film or the gay version of Elmer Fudd from the Looney Tunes franchise.

The Disney/Marvel crossover Phineas and Ferb: Mission Marvel features the Marvel heroes Spider-Man, Iron Man, the Hulk, and Thor, the Marvel villains Whiplash, MODOK, the Red Skull, and Venom, and characters from Phineas and Ferb, where the storyline involves Phineas and Ferb trying to restore power to the Marvel heroes, whose powers were taken away by Doofenshmirtz.

During its 26th season, The Simpsons had crossovers with Family Guy and Futurama. In the hour-long Family Guy season 13 premiere "The Simpsons Guy", the Griffins met the Simpson family, who met the Planet Express crew in the Simpsons episode "Simpsorama".

In the Disney series House of Mouse, Mickey Mouse and friends host a nightclub featuring cameos by other Disney characters.

Webtoons (animated shows from the internet) can also have crossovers with different webtoons, franchises, YouTubers and more. Some examples are when Kate from TomSka's Crash Zoom series makes an appearance in Eddsworld as a trick or treater who possesses Matt and Edd in the episode, "Trick or Threat". In addition to this a couple of characters from Eddsworld make appearances in some Crash Zoom episodes such as "Orcs and Dorks". Another example is Death Battle which is a show where two hosts (Wiz and Boomstick) put two characters from different franchises together to battle each other. These characters range from television, movie, video game, or comic franchises. Shows like One Minute Melee, Cartoon Fight Club, and Death Battle Exhibitions (the spinoff series) have a similar format to Death Battle.

The Netflix original series Harvey Girls Forever is a crossover of the comics Little Audrey, Little Dot and Little Lotta, although later episodes in the third and fourth season are crossovers of Richie Rich and Casper the Friendly Ghost.

in the Warner Bros. Animation Looney Tunes-based animated series Animaniacs, created by Steven Spielberg and Tom Ruegger, characters from its predecessor series Tiny Toon Adventures and its "spin-off" series Freakazoid! (two other cartoons based on the Looney Tunes created by Spielberg and Ruegger), as well as from the actual Looney Tunes shorts, often made crossover cameo appearances throughout the series (some of which are speaking); Similarly, characters from Animaniacs frequently crossed over into Freakazoid! through cameo appearances (again, some cameos are speaking).

Many characters from animated franchises have had crossover episodes, films and specials regardless of the canon of those media open to interpretation; see Category:Crossover animation.

The X-Files and The Simpsons in The Springfield Files.

The Famous Adventures of Mr. Magoo with The Dick Tracy Show.

Anime and manga 
Anime has also participated in many crossover events featuring characters or shows from the same company or network. One of the biggest projects down would be Dream 9 Toriko x One Piece x Dragon Ball Z Super Special Collaboration as it includes three Shonen Jump franchises, being Dragon Ball Z, One Piece, and Toriko, crossed over into an hour long special-like most crossovers, this special is filler, a fan-service episode that follows the common plot line in most crossovers. In the first half of the special, characters from the three franchises meet-up and fight. In the second half, they team up to battle a stronger foe. What makes this crossover unique is when the characters from all three shows split into groups, where the members all share the same clichéd character archetypes, such the main characters Goku, Luffy, and Toriko falling into the dumb, good-natured, strong character archetype.

Carnival Phantasm is also an OVA comedy series based on a Type-Moon gag manga called Take-Moon. Created to celebrate the company's 10th anniversary, the anime consists of several funny and unusual scenarios involving various characters from the Type-Moon franchises. Some examples include characters from Fate/stay night and Tsukihime.

The Dragon Ball franchise is one of the most popular manga and anime in the world, and has its fair share of crossovers as well. The creator of the franchise, Akira Toriyama, has used another character from a different manga series he created, Jaco from Jaco the Galactic Policeman as a reoccurring character in Dragon Ball Super. He comes to Earth to warn the characters about the return of Frieza and is later seen in the disputes involving Beerus and Champa.

Cyborg 009 VS Devilman is a three part anime OVA that crosses over the Cyborg 009 and Devilman series. It originally aired on 17 October 2015 and then was released on 11 November 2015 Netflix currently owns the rights to this title.

Other anime- or manga-based crossovers include: Digimon Fusion and Pokémon Journeys, Fairy Tail x Rave Master, Isekai Quartet, It's a Rumic World: 50th Anniversary Weekly Shonen Sunday, Kamen Rider Fourze x Crayon Shin-chan, Lupin III vs. Detective Conan: the Movie, Tsubasa: Reservoir Chronicle, Undersea Super Train: Marine Express, and Yu-Gi-Oh!: Bonds Beyond Time.; see Category:Crossover anime and manga.

Film 

The first film crossover in a series of Universal Studios monster films was Frankenstein Meets the Wolf Man, in 1943. In 2003, Freddy vs. Jason was released by New Line Cinema. In 2004, 20th Century Fox released Alien vs. Predator along with the sequel Aliens vs. Predator: Requiem in 2007. One year later, both Dollman vs. Demonic Toys and Puppet Master vs Demonic Toys were released by 20th Century Fox and Terry Kelley Studios. In 2015, Sony released Lake Placid vs. Anaconda.

After the comics publishing house Marvel Comics ventured into movie production, they set off to produce solitary films with popular superheroes from the Avengers team, with characters from upcoming films making cameo appearances in films starring another superhero, leading up to the crossover film The Avengers (2012). The same process was repeated for Avengers: Age of Ultron (2015), Avengers: Infinity War (2018), and Avengers: Endgame (2019), and all the movies together form the Marvel Cinematic Universe. Inspired by Marvel's success, Warner Bros., who hold movie rights for DC Comics' heroes, announced the production of Batman v Superman: Dawn of Justice (2016) and further plans to develop the cinematic DC Extended Universe, while Paramount Pictures and Entertainment One announced plans to create a cinematic universe on the Transformers film series.

There have been numerous crossovers in Japanese cinema. The boom of kaiju films saw a lot of crossovers produced at Toho Studios, with some of the monsters forming teams in numerous movies, much like the Marvel movie franchise. Godzilla, Mothra and Rodan (Radon) each first appeared in standalone films before being set against each other or even teaming up against stronger enemies. Their first encounter was in 1964, first in Mothra vs. Godzilla and a few months later of all three in Ghidorah, the Three-Headed Monster. In 1962, Toho released King Kong vs. Godzilla. The long running Zatoichi series sees Shintaro Katsu's blind master swordsman face off with Toshiro Mifune in his iconic role in Zatoichi Meets Yojimbo (1970) and also features a unique cross-Asian project Zatoichi and the One-Armed Swordsman (1971). This coproduction sees Jimmy Wang reprise his famous part of the One-Armed Swordsman while featuring two different endings for both the Japanese and Hong Kong audiences; see Category:Crossover films.

Games 

Crossovers in video games occur when otherwise separated fictional characters, stories, settings, universes, or media in a video game meet and interact with each other. These can range from a character simply appearing as a playable character or boss in the game, as a special guest character, or a major crossover where two or more franchises encounter.

Konami made the first crossover video game featuring Simon Belmont from Castlevania, Universal Pictures' King Kong and Mikey from the Warner Bros. movie The Goonies in Konami Wai Wai World for the Famicom in 1988. The King of Fighters, Marvel vs. Capcom, and many other franchises from third-party developers such as Capcom and SNK bring these licenses together.

The 2.5D fighting game series Super Smash Bros. brings various Nintendo characters together and allow players to fight against each other as these characters in arenas. The third game in the series, Super Smash Bros. Brawl introduced two third-party characters with the inclusion of Solid Snake and Sonic the Hedgehog, of Konami's Metal Gear series and Sega's Sonic the Hedgehog series respectively. The fourth installments, Super Smash Bros. for Nintendo 3DS and Super Smash Bros. for Wii U, feature characters from the third-party franchises of Capcom's Mega Man (Mega Man) and Street Fighter (Ryu), Sega's Bayonetta (Bayonetta), Bandai Namco's Pac-Man (Pac-Man), and Square Enix's Final Fantasy (Cloud Strife), in addition to other Nintendo characters from the company's different universes. The fifth installment, Super Smash Bros. Ultimate also introduced Simon and Richter Belmont from Konami's Castlevania series, Ken Masters from Capcom's Street Fighter series, Joker from Persona 5, the Hero from the Dragon Quest series, Banjo-Kazooie from the Banjo-Kazooie series, Terry Bogard from the Fatal Fury series, Steve from Minecraft, Sephiroth from Final Fantasy VII, Kazuya Mishima from the Tekken series, and Sora from Kingdom Hearts in addition to bringing back all of the playable characters from the previous entries in the series.

The Namco-developed Soul series features characters from a variety of other franchises including Link from Nintendo's The Legend of Zelda series, Heihachi Mishima from Tekken, Todd McFarlane's Spawn, Darth Vader, Yoda, and Starkiller from Star Wars, Lloyd Irving from Tales of Symphonia, Ubisoft Montreal's Ezio Auditore from the Assassin's Creed series, Geralt of Rivia from Andrzej Sapkowski's The Witcher, YoRHa No. 2 Type B from Yoko Taro and PlatinumGames' Nier: Automata, and Haohmaru from SNK's Samurai Shodown.

Mario & Sonic at the Olympic Games, released in Japan two months before Super Smash Bros. Brawl, was the first time that Mario and Sonic (as well as their associated characters) appeared in a game together.

The Kingdom Hearts series of role-playing games developed by Square Enix features a number of characters from Disney and Square Enix.

Starting with Mortal Kombat, video game developer NetherRealm Studios has guest characters ranging from Mortal Kombat veterans Scorpion, Sub-Zero and Raiden to Freddy Krueger from A Nightmare on Elm Street, Jason Voorhees from Friday the 13th, Leatherface from The Texas Chainsaw Massacre, The Xenomorph from Alien, The Predator from Predator, the T-800 from Terminator, John Rambo from Rambo, RoboCop from RoboCop, Kratos from God of War, The Joker from Batman, all four Teenage Mutant Ninja Turtles, Todd McFarlane's Spawn and Mike Mignola's Hellboy.

Super Robot Wars are turn-based strategy games featuring a variety of Japanese mecha series from many generations, such as Mazinger Z, Gundam, Neon Genesis Evangelion, and GaoGaiGar.

Warriors Orochi is the game that features the casts of both the Dynasty Warriors and Samurai Warriors series. The third installment of this series included a number of playable characters from other Koei Tecmo properties, such as Ninja Gaiden, Dead or Alive, Zill O'll, and Sophitia Alexandra from Bandai Namco's Soul series. Warriors All-Stars similarly crossed-over a number of characters from Koei Tecmo series.

Video game developer Capcom has frequently developed crossover fighting games featuring their own characters and those of another IP holder, including Marvel vs. Capcom, SNK vs. Capcom, Tatsunoko vs. Capcom, and Street Fighter X Tekken.

Heroes of the Storm is an example of the major crossover video game which is developed and published by Blizzard Entertainment. This hero brawler brings various Blizzard's characters together as playable heroes, as well as different battlegrounds based on Warcraft, Diablo, StarCraft, and Overwatch universes.

Perhaps one of the most notable video game crossovers is Lego Dimensions which makes use of over 30 different franchises, including DC Comics, Doctor Who, The Lego Movie, The Lord of the Rings, Sonic the Hedgehog, and more.

A large number of video game characters make cameo appearances in the Disney computer-animated film Wreck-It Ralph and its sequel.

Literature 

In literature, some authors also engage in crossovers by including characters from different novels they have written in one; see Category:Crossover novels.

The first popular crossover in literature was the 1885 Mark Twain novel, The Adventures of Huckleberry Finn, which had an important guest appearance by Tom Sawyer. Similarly, Lady Glencora Palliser from the Pallisers series of Anthony Trollope appears towards the end of Miss Mackenzie, a novel published between the first and second Palliser novels in 1865, a character first introduced in the novel, Can You Forgive Her? (1864). Andrew Lang's 1890 collection, Old Friends: Essays in Epistolary Parody, contains letters combining characters from different sources, including one based on Jane Austen's Northanger Abbey and Charlotte Brontë's Jane Eyre.

Kim Newman frequently uses this device, as does Stephen King. The works of James Branch Cabell, J.D. Salinger, William Faulkner, Margaret Laurence, Thomas Pynchon, Kurt Vonnegut, Mordecai Richler, Edgar Rice Burroughs, Robert Heinlein, and Isaac Asimov also cross over with each other, linking different characters and settings together over a number of different works. Author Rick Riordan publishes multiple book series featuring gods of ancient civilizations in the modern day, which have had two crossovers and three references to other series. Science fiction writer Poul Anderson allowed fellow writer A. Bertram Chandler to "borrow" Anderson's space-faring character Dominic Flandry and let Flandry meet with Chandler's John Grimes in a common adventure (the two fail to like each other). Alex Scarrow featured the characters Cato and Macro from his brother Simon's Eagles of the Empire series in one book of the TimeRiders series: Gates of Rome (2012), serving as supporting characters when the three protagonists travel back in time to Ancient Rome.

Brazilian writer Monteiro Lobato also created solid and imaginative crossovers, using elements and characters from Brazilian folklore such as the Cuca and Saci, from Greek mythology, from the Arabian Nights, from fairy tales such as Grimm's "Snow White", Western literature such as Peter Pan, cartoons such as Popeye and Felix the Cat, and Western films.

Illustrator Howard Pyle conceived his work Twilight Land as one such crossover. In it, a nameless narrator is transported to "Twilight Land" and meets famous fairy tale characters for a soirée in an inn: Mother Goose, Cinderella, Fortunatus, Sinbad the Sailor, Aladdin, Boots, the Valiant Little Tailor, and others gather in the framing device and tell each other adventurous tales featuring other literary personages.

French author Jules Lemaître wrote a sort of sequel to Cinderella, named Princess Mimi, where Cinderella's daughter is courted by Polyphemus and Charles Perrault's Hop-o'-My-Thumb.

Irish novelist and author Padraic Colum reworked several Irish myths in his book The King of Ireland's Son to create a complex narrative, many of them corresponding to tale types in the Aarne-Thompson-Uther Index. In the first segment, Fedelma, the Enchanter's Daughter, the oldest son of the King of Ireland loses a wager against his father's enemy and is ordered to find him a year and a day's time. With the help of an eagle, the prince spies three swan maidens descending to bathe in a lake and hides the feather cloak of the youngest, Fedelma, promising to return it once she direct him to her father's kingdom. After arriving at the kingdom of the Enchanter of the Black Back-Lands, the wizard forced the prince to fulfill three difficult tasks, which he accomplishes with Fedelma's magical help (tale type ATU 313, "The Magical Flight" or The Master Maid). In the chapter The Unique Tale, a story is told about a queen who wished for a blue-eyed, blonde-haired daughter, and carelessly wished her sons to "go with the wild geese". As soon as the daughter (named Sheen, 'Storm') is born, the seven princes change into gray wild geese and fly away from the castle (ATU 451, "The Maiden Who Seeks her Brothers" or The Six Swans). It is later revealed that Sheen changed her name to Caintigern and became Queen when she married the King of Ireland, who, in turn, is the father of two of the main characters: the King of Ireland's Son and Gilly of the Goatskin (Gilla Na Chreck An Gour).

Public domain 

It is also common for authors to 'crossover' characters who have passed into the public domain, and thus do not require copyright or royalty payments for their use in other works. The League of Extraordinary Gentlemen by Alan Moore and Kevin O'Neill is another example of this, as all of the main characters and most of the secondary / background characters are fictional characters whose copyright has expired, and all are characters of different authors and creators brought together within one massive extended universe. Many of the works of Philip José Farmer's Wold Newton family sequences (which has also been explored and developed by other authors) also utilize and interweave numerous otherwise unrelated fictional characters into a rich family history by speculating familial connections between them (such as a blood-relationship between Sherlock Holmes and Tarzan). Roger Zelazny's novel A Night in the Lonesome October combines Sherlock Holmes, Doctor Frankenstein, Jack the Ripper, and the Cthulhu Mythos, although he never specifically identifies them as such ("The Count", "The Good Doctor", "Jack", etc.).

Occasionally, authors will include into crossovers classic fictional characters whose copyright is still held by the original authors (or at least their estates), but who are nevertheless considered iconic or 'mythic' enough to be recognised from a few character traits or descriptions without being directly named (thus not requiring royalties payments to be made to the copyright holder). A prominent example occurs within The League of Extraordinary Gentlemen, Volume One, wherein a character who is clearly intended in appearance and description by other characters to be Dr. Fu Manchu appears as a significant villain; however, as this character was not in the public domain at the time of writing and the rights still held by the estate of his creator Sax Rohmer, he is not directly named as such in the work and is only referred to as 'the Devil Doctor'. Something similar occurs in The League of Extraordinary Gentlemen: Black Dossier, wherein a character named "Jimmy" is clearly intended to be Ian Fleming's character James Bond, though here he is satirized as being an inept and unfavorable antagonist, likely to parody Sean Connery's appearance in the 2003 film adaptation. Another example in The League of Extraordinary Gentlemen is when a character is named to be the Anti-Christ, yet, despite never being named, is shown to be an evil Harry Potter.

The TV show Once Upon a Time is set in a world in which all fairy tales coexist, including Snow White, Little Red Riding Hood, and even Alice in Wonderland. (As a production of The Walt Disney Company, copyrighted elements from that company's productions have appeared in Once Upon a Time.) The Shrek film series is built on the same concept, and even includes references to then-copyrighted elements like Peter Pan (often in the form of satire).

Television series

Between established shows
Crossovers involving principals can also occur when the characters have no prior relationship, but are related by time period, locale or profession. The Law and Order series, for example, afford a commonality of setting and profession which lends itself to crossovers, both within the franchise and in a wider universe. Law & Order: SVU has crossed over several times with Chicago P.D. and Chicago Fire, as well as sharing a common character with Homicide: Life on the Street. NCIS has crossed over with NCIS: Los Angeles, NCIS: New Orleans and JAG, while NCIS: Los Angeles has crossed over with both Scorpion and Hawaii Five-0. Following the cancellation of the ABC soap opera One Life to Live and its high-rated finale, several characters crossed over into the network's remaining soap opera General Hospital, remaining in the same timeline as their former show.

The CSI franchise is another common example of the crossover phenomena, with the original series crossing over with CSI: Miami, CSI: Cyber, CSI: NY and Without a Trace. CSI: NY crossed over with fellow CBS series Cold Case, and Ted Danson appeared as a regular on both CSI and Cyber. Similarly, Family Guy has crossed over with The Simpsons, while The Simpsons has crossed over with Futurama. The X-Files has in turn crossed over with Millennium, Homicide: Life on the Street, The Lone Gunmen and Cops. A proposed crossover with The West Wing was planned, but was never produced.

The Beverly Hillbillies, Green Acres, and  Petticoat Junction shared a common universe, so crossovers were not uncommon. Doctor Who and Torchwood both take place in the same universe and have had multiple crossovers, including Torchwood characters appearing in "The Stolen Earth" and "Journey's End". Torchwoods first series finale ends with the materialisation sound of the TARDIS seen in Doctor Whos series 3 episode "Utopia".

Between related shows
Though most common on shows of the same production company (see, for example, "Hurricane Saturday"), crossovers have also occurred because shows share the same distributor or television network. A notable example of this kind of link is that between Murder, She Wrote and Magnum, P.I. These shows were made by different companies, but owned by Universal Studios and broadcast on CBS. Another case is that of Mad About You and Friends, which share the character of Ursula Buffay. Neither show shares any production or distribution commonality, but rather an actress (Lisa Kudrow), a setting (New York City) and a schedule (Friends initially followed Mad About You on NBC's Thursday night schedule).

Mad About You and Friends share another type of "network crossover". On rare occasions, networks have chosen to theme an entire night's programming around a crossover "event". In one case, a New York City blackout caused by Paul Reiser's character on Mad About You was experienced by the characters on Friends and Madman of the People. Such "event nights" can also be linked by a single character's quest across multiple shows on the same evening. ABC attempted this kind of "event night" crossover with its Friday night programming during the 1997 season. There, they proposed that the title character of Sabrina the Teenage Witch should chase her cat, Salem, through Boy Meets World, You Wish and Teen Angel because it had run away with a "time ball" that was displacing each show through time.

ABC also attempted a "crossover" when four of its sitcoms (Grace Under Fire, Ellen, The Drew Carey Show and Coach) all went to Las Vegas during the 1996–1997 season.

Dan Schneider used his show Zoey 101 to promote his new show iCarly by making characters from Zoey 101 go to ICarly.com or use the iCarly theme song as a ringtone. A Henry Danger comic book and Gibby's wax head is seen in the Game Shakers episode "Lost Jacket, Falling Pigeons", the subway station's lost and found.

The CW's superhero franchise Arrowverse has held annual crossover events since 2014.

Narrative rationales
On other occasions, crossovers between established shows can occur without a network or production commonality, but simply because there is some narrative rationale for the crossover. The appearance of detective John Munch (from NBC's Homicide: Life on the Street) on Fox's The X-Files happened merely because the episode revolved around a crime scene in Baltimore, a logical place for characters on The X-Files to have encountered Munch. Munch would also appear on the TV series Law & Order on NBC in which it had one episode which began on that series in New York City and concluded in Baltimore on Homicide: Life on the Street. Later, when Homicide went off the air in 1999, Detective Munch ends up leaving Baltimore to move to New York, and becoming a permanent character (as New York City Detective Munch) on NBC's Law & Order: Special Victims Unit until October 2013.

A two-part crossover episode between CSI: Crime Scene Investigation with Without a Trace aired on November 8, 2007. The first hour was on CSI and the second hour was on Without a Trace. While both series are on the same network in the United States, spreading two parts of a story across two different shows can cause problems in international markets where they have been separately sold to different broadcasters. For example, in the United Kingdom, Without a Trace was shown on Channel 4 and CSI on Channel 5, meaning the two companies had to come to a special agreement to show both episodes. Another CSI crossover occurred in 2009 when Raymond Langston from CSI: Crime Scene Investigation appeared both in CSI: Miami and CSI: NY, traveling to Miami and New York to track a human trafficking and organ harvesting ring. ER had a crossover with Third Watch which corresponded with a peak in viewership for the latter show, with 17.2 million viewers.

In 2013, the Canadian crime drama series Republic of Doyle and Murdoch Mysteries produced a crossover, which was complicated by the shows' incompatible historical settings; Murdoch Mysteries is a historical series set in the 1890s, while Republic of Doyle is set in the present day. The problem was solved by having the actors cross over as relatives of their primary characters; Allan Hawco appeared on the November 25, 2013 episode of Murdoch Mysteries as Jacob Doyle, a 19th-century ancestor of his regular character Jake Doyle, while Yannick Bisson appeared on a January 2014 episode of Republic of Doyle as Bill Murdoch, a 21st-century descendant of his regular character William Murdoch.

In children's television
The earliest example in the 1970s is PBS' The Electric Company.

Disney Channel's Suite Life franchise has featured three crossovers: In 2006, That's So Suite Life of Hannah Montana featured characters from Hannah Montana and That's So Raven taking a vacation at the Tipton Hotel (the main setting of The Suite Life of Zack & Cody); Hannah Montana/Miley Stewart (Miley Cyrus) also eats cake off Zack; this recurs when she eats cake off of Cody during the 2009 crossover Wizards on Deck with Hannah Montana, in which characters from Wizards of Waverly Place and Hannah Montana come on aboard the S.S. Tipton (though the characters from Wizards of Waverly Place and Hannah Montana do not interact). In 2011 episode of Good Luck Charlie, the family are getting ready
to go to Chicago to see CeCe and Rocky. In the 2013 holiday special, the family meets the cast of Jessie. The New Year's Eve special Austin & Jessie & Ally All Star New Year, which aired in that year, features characters from Austin & Ally and Jessie. In 2014, Liv & Maddie characters are having a Hawaiian party with the cast of Jessie. In 2015, a crossover between two Disney XD shows Lab Rats: Bionic Island and Mighty Med crossed over in the special "Lab Rats vs. Mighty Med". In the 2020 episode of Bunk'd, the cast are meeting with Raven Baxter.

The network's animated series does crossovers such as Lilo & Stitch: The Series and Phineas and Ferb.

Disney Junior does crossovers such as Special Agent Oso and Elena of Avalor.

Another type of crossover involves characters from an off-the-air series resurfacing in a newer series. This occurred in a 2010 episode of the Nickelodeon sitcom iCarly; the episode "iStart a Fan War" featured recurring characters from two Nickelodeon series: Drake & Josh characters Eric Blonowitz, Craig Ramirez, Gavin Mitchell, and Zoey 101 character Stacey Dillsen. A crossover between Victorious and Drake & Josh also occurred, with Helen DuBois, portrayed by Yvette Nicole Brown making an appearance. An episode titled "iParty with Victorious" was a crossover between iCarly and Victorious. This means all four shows exist in the same universe. However, in Who Did It to Trina, Tori referred to Drake and Josh as a TV show, making it seem as if the previous appearance was an actor of a character from a show within a show. Also in several episodes from iCarly and Sam & Cat (a crossover/spin-off of iCarly and Victorious) one can see Drake and Josh and Zoey 101 in TV guides, when the characters are watching TV. Carly and Spencer were heard watching it in the iCarly episode iGet Pranky and Carly is seen looking at it briefly in iToe Fat Cakes and we can see the character Megan from Drake and Josh (also portrayed by Miranda Cosgrove) and Sam is seen changing the channel to it in #FavoriteShow an episode from Sam & Cat, making the universe between each of the shows confusing. However, these were probably all non-canonical references.

In 2014, The Thundermans and The Haunted Hathaways did a crossover, titled "The Haunted Thundermans". In 2016, Henry Danger and The Thundermans did a crossover, titled "Danger & Thunder". In 2017, Henry Danger and Game Shakers did a crossover, called "Danger Games", which was then followed by a crossover episode, called "Babe Loves Danger", that aired in 2018. In 2017, Game Shakers did a crossover with iCarly, titled "Game Shippers". In 2019, Henry Danger did a crossover with Knight SquadNick Jr. does a crossover with The Fresh Beat Band are meeting the cast of Yo Gabba Gabba!.

The main characters of Aaahh!!! Real Monsters make a crossover appearance in the Rugrats episode, "Ghost Story". This is because both shows were created/produced by Klasky Csupo and distributed also by Nickelodeon. In 2004, the animated series The Fairy OddParents had a three-episode crossover with CGI character Jimmy Neutron. The Loud House did a crossover with Double Dare.

Cartoon Network does crossovers such as The Grim Adventures of Billy & Mandy and OK K.O.! Let's Be Heroes.

In Chile, children's programmes and characters from El Mundo del Profesor Rossa (Spanish for The World of Professor Rossa) and Cachureos (Chilean Spanish for odds and ends) conducted a crossover between them for a few minutes in their emissions of Saturday 18 (Mundo del Profesor Rossa) and Sunday 19 (Cachureos) of April 1998 due to the introduction of the latter programme on Canal 13, after several years of broadcast on TVN and even have competed with each other for the child audience.

The Netflix series Harvey Girls Forever! (which back then was known as Harvey Street Kids in 2018) has crossed over with famous cartoon character Richie Rich for its third and fourth seasons. There is also a crossover episode called "Scare Bud", which the show crossed over with Casper the Friendly Ghost.

Special usages

Promotional cameos
Crossovers can take the form of a promotional cameo appearance, used to draw attention to another work of fiction, with little rational explanation in the context of the hosting show's narrative. When not clearly presented as parody, this is frequently scorned by fans as blatant commercialism. A notable example of this is The Simpsons episode "A Star Is Burns", in which the character of Jay Sherman (from The Critic) appeared. It originally aired on March 5, 1995, on FOX right before The Critic began its second season, its first season having aired on ABC. This episode was largely condemned by fans of The Simpsons as existing to promote The Critic, an animated series considered inferior by comparison. Even Simpsons creator Matt Groening objected, preferring to remove his name from the credits of that particular episode in protest.

The character Dan Tanna (played by Robert Urich) from the detective series Vega$ appeared in an episode of Charlie's Angels ("Angels in Vegas") one week prior to the debut of Vega$. However, it is not considered a spin-off because Dan Tanna was introduced in the pilot that was aired as an ABC TV Movie of the Week on the evening of Tuesday, April 25, 1978. The crossover was simply used to reintroduce the Dan Tanna character and to promote the debut of Vega$ as an ongoing series. Additionally, the cast of The Love Boat appeared in the fourth season premier of Charlie's Angels ("Love Boat Angels").

In 2010, as a nod to the 50th anniversary of Coronation Street, characters in fellow established TV soap EastEnders made reference to watching the special anniversary episode. EastEnders had celebrated its own 25th anniversary earlier in the same year.

The two CBS Daytime game shows (The Price Is Right and Let's Make a Deal) are used for promotional cameos from other CBS properties. Promotional cameos from the two daytime dramas, primetime shows (including primetime airings), and sports properties are common. Price has been used to promote anniversaries of CBS daytime dramas, the NCIS franchise, the three reality shows, and CBS Sports' coverage of the NFL.

Spin-offs

In its simplest and most common form, a television crossover involves a starring character on a parent show appearing on a spin-off or vice versa because of established character relationships. An obvious example of this type of crossover occurred when Cliff Huxtable of The Cosby Show visited his daughter, Denise, on A Different World. Another example of this is The Bionic Woman, which was a spin-off from The Six Million Dollar Man. Jaime Sommers was a tennis pro who was nearly killed in a skydiving accident, but her life was saved by Oscar Goldman (Richard Anderson) and Dr. Rudy Wells (Martin E. Brooks) who surgically implanted her with bionic parts similar to those of Steve Austin. Steve Austin and Jaimie Sommers often crossovered, while the characters Oscar Goldman and Rudy Wells appeared regularly in both shows. Another example would be the appearances made by Buffy the Vampire Slayer characters to Angel in Los Angeles from Sunnydale; in a striking example, "Fool for Love" and "Darla", shown on the same night, contain overlapping flashbacks as remembered by Spike and Darla respectively. There is also Frasier, which features characters from the first show, Cheers. Similarly, Dallas characters J. R. Ewing, Bobby Ewing, Lucy Ewing and Kristin Shepard all appeared in its spin-off Knots Landing while Knots Landing characters Gary Ewing and Valene Ewing each made several appearances on Dallas after Knots Landing premiered.

More complex multi-production franchises can utilize crossovers of characters to serve as a device in establishing continuity in a shared fictional universe. This crossover is common in the Star Trek universe, where minor guest stars from one series have appeared as featured guest stars later ones. A good example of this crossover is that of the Klingons Kor (from the Original Series episode "Errand of Mercy"), Koloth (from "The Trouble with Tribbles") and Kang (from "Day of the Dove"). After the passage of about a century of narrative time, the three onetime adversaries of Captain Kirk appeared together in the Star Trek: Deep Space Nine episode, "Blood Oath" – as the Klingons and Federation had become allies in the century between, the former villains are now portrayed as heroes. Another Klingon, Arne Darvin, appeared as a secondary character in "The Trouble with Tribbles", but was the principal villain of DS9's "Trials and Tribble-ations". Intended as a celebration of the franchise's 30th anniversary, "Trials and Tribble-ations" was actually a crossover in and of itself; using then brand-new bluescreen techniques, the episode places the DS9 cast (after hijacking the Defiant, Darvin had gone back in time hoping to kill Kirk and become a hero to the Klingons, and it's up to Sisko and his comrades to stop Darvin and preserve the timeline) inside the TOS episode, interacting with James T. Kirk, Spock and the rest of the Enterprise crew.

The distinction between "spin-off" and "crossover" is sometimes narrow. The two terms can become especially conflated if two shows are linked by a guest star with a single appearance. There is debate, for instance over whether Out of the Blue is a spin-off of Happy Days, or whether the star of Out of the Blue merely crossed over into Happy Days.Mako Mermaids, a spinoff of H2O: Just Add Water, featured a guest appearance by Rikki Chadwick, a main character from the former series, in its final two episodes, thus confirming that the spin off-acts as a sequel rather than a prequel or alternative storyline as many fans suspected.

Parodic crossovers
Often, the problems of bringing together two shows with different narrative ambitions make the writing of a crossover burdensome. Such difficulties are encountered by situation comedies that wish to crossover with dramatic television programs. The satirical crossover—ranging in length from a cameo to a full comedy sketch or episode—is an extremely popular way of circumventing this problem. By various means, such crossovers typically avoid outcry from fans by being obvious parody or homage. However, on rare occasion, the humor of such crossovers can be used by one show make a narrative point by capitalizing on the audience's experience of the other program.

Such tongue-in-cheek crossovers typically fall into one of several broad categories.

Parodic crossovers can be directly established as being outside the continuity of one or all of the properties being crossed over. A good example is the crossover between The Simpsons and The X-Files, which was largely accepted as being outside standard X-Files continuity.

One episode of The Grim Adventures of Billy & Mandy shows that after Mandy smiles, she, along with Billy and Grim, are transformed into The Powerpuff Girls with a cameo by Professor Utonium.

They can occur by virtue of a dream sequence, in which the characters of one show will appear as part of a dream had by a character on another show. This method was perhaps used most famously to explain to audiences that the entirety of Newhart had been the dream of Bob Newhart's character on The Bob Newhart Show. It has more recently been used to demonstrate that cast members of The Young and the Restless appeared in a dream of a character on The King of Queens.

Parodic crossovers can take the form of "gag" cameos by characters of one property appearing on another. Characters from King of the Hill have appeared on The Simpsons to comment on a peewee football game. Gag cameos may also include the appearance of an actor from another show, but not necessarily the character that the actor played. For instance, on the ABC/CBS show Family Matters during the closing credits of the episode "Scenes From a Mall" (Season 5, Episode 12), a scene which was shown earlier in the episode featuring Reginald VelJohnson is re-played, but this time with one of the child actors stating that he "looks like that fat guy from Fresh Prince," referring to James Avery who played Judge Phillip Banks on NBC's The Fresh Prince of Bel-Air. To the obvious surprise of the studio audience and VelJohnson, Avery walked onto the set with an angry look, being in on the staged joke himself. Ended the episode (but with the cameras filming still), VelJohnson and Avery hugged and smilingly greeted the public.

Crossovers of this type can also be completely wordless. This type of crossover is more common on animated programs, such as when Bender found and ate Bart Simpson's shorts on Futurama, or Milhouse had a talking Bender doll on The Simpsons. This would seem to be another case when a popular franchise is acknowledged as fiction and not a crossover of the stories.

Perhaps the most obvious parodic crossover is found when characters from two series interact outside either series. This occurs most commonly on a sketch comedy show or as a humorous interlude on an award telecast. Such crossovers may sometimes involve the real actors—for example, a sketch on Royal Canadian Air Farce saw Yasir and Sarah from Little Mosque on the Prairie buying the gas station from Corner Gas, with many of the characters in the sketch being portrayed by the shows' real actors—although they may also feature one genuine star from the show amid a cast comprised otherwise of the sketch show's own stable of actors. Such crossovers are generally immediately apparent as parodies to the audience—and in no way considered a part of either show's continuity—due to the need for the hosting show to approximate the sets and costumes of the satirized programs quickly and inexpensively. When Patrick Stewart appeared in a Star Trek: The Next Generation/The Love Boat crossover on Saturday Night Live, for instance, few Star Trek fans would have been fooled by the visual design into believing the event "counted" as an episode of the show. However, there are some cases of this type of parody having some canonical resonance with viewers. For instance, the British charity appeal Comic Relief often contains parodic crossovers of a technically higher quality than the typical sketch show. Many of these Relief sketches are produced by the cast and crew of the actual programs being parodied, and hence appear to be "normal" episodes. A good example of this is the sketch, "BallyKissDibley", an 11-minute piece in which the leads of Ballykissangel appeared on the sets of  The Vicar of Dibley, alongside most of Dibleys cast. Since the sketch derived its humor from all actors remaining in character, the extent to which these parodies "count" as part of either show's canon is more open to interpretation than most sketch crossovers.

Parodic crossovers can be used to lend verisimilitude to the fictional world of a program. Characters from a fictional television series may appear on a stylized version of an established non-fictional television series, such as game shows or reality shows. These crossovers between celebrity hosts and fictional characters are quite common on situation comedies. Mama's Family once appeared on Family Feud and the townsfolk of The Vicar of Dibley have had their heirlooms valuated on Antiques Roadshow, for instance. In such cases, it is generally the non-fictional show which ends up being the most satirized, due to a need to compress the experience to its most recognizable elements. However, these crossovers can happen on dramatic television, such as when Blue Peter provided narrative exposition on The Sarah Jane Adventures. Rarely, brief crossovers between two fictional programs can be used for this same purpose. In the episode, "Army of Ghosts", Peggy Mitchell was seen in a fictionalized scene from EastEnders in order to demonstrate the degree to which the titular ghosts had permeated the popular culture of Doctor Whos Britain. Here, too, time constraints caused the satire of the guest programme (EastEnders) and not the host program (Doctor Who).

Retroactive crossovers
Sometimes, crossovers occur even when there was no explicit intent to create them. Viewer interpretation can play into the size and complexity of crossovers. These sorts of crossovers involve no creation of additional material, but merely result from inferences drawn about existing filmed episodes. Usually they are a product of narrative ambiguity. Perhaps the best example of this was caused by the unusual ending to St. Elsewhere. One interpretation of the ending scene of the final episode has been that the entire run of the program was a figment of autistic character Tommy Westphall's imagination. This leads itself to a broad interpretation of the events of that series. Because the show had direct crossovers with twelve different programmes, and each one of these twelve had numerous other crossovers, linkages can be found from Elsewhere to 280 other shows, comprising what has been called "the Tommy Westphall Universe".

 Tokusatsu for Japan 
 Kamen Rider Super Sentai Ultra Series Metal Hero Series Chouseishin Series German crossover 
One of the earlier instances of crossovers in TV productions outside the US is the episode  (1990), which was produced by WDR and DFF as a crossover between the West German crime series Tatort and the East German crime series Polizeiruf 110''. Their respective popular heroes Horst Schimanski and Peter Fuchs join forces to solve a case in the turmoil of the time after the fall of the Berlin Wall. The episode was produced during the short transition period between the fall of the Berlin Wall and the reunification of Germany.

See also

 Amalgam Comics
 Canon (fiction)
 Callback (comedy)
 Continuity (fiction)
 Cross-licensing
 Fanfiction
 Fictional character
 Fictional universe
 Intercompany crossover
 Shared universe
 Tommy Westphall
 Wold Newton family

References

External links
 Thoughts On Crossovers In General (Kathryn Andersen) An essay musing on the numerous elements necessary to a successful crossover (primarily aimed at fan-written fiction).
 World Newton Universe Crossover Chronology Crossovers which build upon and take place in Philip José Farmer's World Newton continuity.
 "On Crossovers", Jess Nevins' history of the fictional crossover

 
Comics terminology
Film and video terminology
Television terminology